James Herbert FitzGerald (1910–1973) was an American sculptor from Seattle, Washington. He received a degree in architecture at University of Washington and worked at Spokane Art Center. He has been called "[one] of the Pacific Northwest's preeminent artists of [his] period", and "among the most innovative modern artists active in the Pacific Northwest."

He was born and raised in Seattle, graduating from the University of Washington in 1935. FitzGerald went on to study at Yale University in 1938, where he received a Carnegie Graduate Fellowship, and at the Kansas City Art Institute. He created works for the Treasury Relief Art Project (TRAP) and the Department of Justice in the 1930s with Boardman Robinson; and worked on other Works Progress Administration art programs in Washington state. While he also studied as a painter, FitzGerald switched primarily to bronze sculpture in 1959 and became a well-known fountain designer. He established his own foundry in 1964.

FitzGerald married Margaret Tomkins, a painter, and had three children.

Selected works

Department of Justice murals (with Boardman Robinson)
Bas relief panels at the east portals of the Mount Baker Tunnel, Seattle, a designated Seattle landmark
Waterfront Fountain, Waterfront Park, Seattle
Centennial Fountain, Marina Park, Kirkland, Washington
Fountain of the Northwest, Intiman Theater at Seattle Center
Tile mosaic, Washington State Library, Washington State Capitol campus, Olympia, Washington
Fountain of Freedom (aka Scudder Plaza Fountain), Woodrow Wilson School of Public and International Affairs, Princeton University
Rain Forest, as part of the Western Washington University Public Sculpture Collection

References

Further reading

External links
Brief biography and example works

1910 births
20th-century American sculptors
20th-century American male artists
American male sculptors
1973 deaths
Sculptors from Washington (state)
Artists from Seattle
University of Washington alumni
People of the New Deal arts projects
Federal Art Project artists
Treasury Relief Art Project artists